"Blackout" is a song by British rapper Wretch 32, featuring vocals from British recording artist Shakka. It was released on 12 May 2013. The song was produced by Knox Brown. The song was written by Jermaine Scott, Shakka Philip and Brown. Choreography and Movement Direction by Josh Kinsella.

Music video
A music video to accompany the release of "Blackout" was first released onto YouTube on 28 March 2013 at a total length of three minutes and forty-nine seconds.

Track listing

Personnel
 Vocals - Wretch 32, Shakka
 Songwriting - Jermaine Scott, Shakka Philip, Knox Brown
 Production - Knox Brown

Chart performance

Weekly charts

Year-end charts

Release history

References

2013 songs
2013 singles
Wretch 32 songs
Shakka (singer) songs
Ministry of Sound singles
Songs written by Wretch 32